Flavio Germán Ciampichetti (born 7 March 1988) is an Argentine professional footballer who plays as a forward for Primera Nacional club Guillermo Brown.

Club career
On 28 June 2019, he signed a one-year contract with an extension option with the Belgian First Division A club Eupen. On 21 September 2020, Ciampichetti agreed a one season deal with Spanish third-tier team Cultural Leonesa.

In August 2021, Ciampichetti signed with Chilean club Deportes Puerto Montt. In January 2022, he returned to his former club Guillermo Brown, competing in the second division of Argentina.

Career statistics

Club

References

External links
 Profile at BDFA 
 
 

1988 births
People from Pergamino
Living people
Argentine footballers
Association football forwards
Defensores de Belgrano de Villa Ramallo players
Club Atlético Douglas Haig players
Club Social y Deportivo La Emilia players
Quilmes Atlético Club footballers
Guillermo Brown footballers
C.D. Antofagasta footballers
C.S.D. Macará footballers
K.A.S. Eupen players
Cultural y Deportiva Leonesa players
Deportes Puerto Montt footballers
Primera Nacional players
Torneo Argentino A players
Chilean Primera División players
Ecuadorian Serie A players
Belgian Pro League players
Argentine expatriate footballers
Expatriate footballers in Chile
Expatriate footballers in Ecuador
Expatriate footballers in Belgium
Expatriate footballers in Spain
Argentine expatriate sportspeople in Chile
Argentine expatriate sportspeople in Ecuador
Argentine expatriate sportspeople in Belgium
Argentine expatriate sportspeople in Spain
Sportspeople from Buenos Aires Province